Guimbal, officially the Municipality of Guimbal, is a 4th class municipality in the province of Iloilo, Philippines. According to the 2020 census, it has a population of 35,022 people.

With a  shoreline facing the blue waters of Panay Gulf, it has attracted tourists from different places because of its scenic beaches and inland resorts.

Guimbal produces mango in Iloilo as well as other seasonal fruits. Farming and fishing are among the main sources of livelihood of its people.

History
The first reference to Guimbal by such name in Spanish records appeared in Father Coco's appendix to Medina's “The History of the Augustinian Order in the Philippines” Where it referred to the establishment of a convento in Guimbal, Iloilo in 1590.

A closer fact compared to some other writings showed that the name of the municipality was derived from a musical instrument called guimba drum. The Spaniards discovered the settlers using the instrument to warn the people of the coming of the raiding Moro pirates who used to loot the town and capture the natives to be sold as slaves in Mindanao. To show gratitude to the instrument, with high spirit and pride as the unconquered people, the inhabitants had named their settlement Guimbal.

Geography
Guimbal, a coastal municipality, is located at the south-western part of Iloilo province. It is situated between the coordinates of 1250 57’ longitude, and 100 39’ latitude. It is only six feet above sea level, and has varying features in terms of its slopes and elevation.

Climate

Type I climate, characterized by two district seasons: dry season, which falls from December to May, and the wet season, which is from June to December.

Barangays

Guimbal is politically subdivided into 33 barangays. 11 within the Poblacion (Town Center) and 22 outside poblacion.

Poblacion:

Demographics

Economy

Transportation

A 45-minute drive from Iloilo City, Guimbal is accessible from all points of Panay Island. its baranggays are served by municipal and other provincial jeepneys and buses that pass through the town and by almost 180 tricycles and 350 motorbikes playing their respective routes. The transport of farm products to the poblacion and the city is made easy by farm-to-market roads.

Government

Elected officials
Members of the municipal council (2019 - 2022):
 Mayor: Oscar G. Garin, Sr.
 Vice Mayor: Jennifer Garin-Colada
 SB Members:
 Mary Ann Suyao-Lujan
 Christy Love Custodio-Margarico
 Fidel G. Gellangarin
 Kenneth G. Gersabalino
 Edmund O. Gomez, PhD
 Pablito G. Gemarino
 Tita G. Garrucha
 Jo Marie G. Temelo
 Liga. Pres. Marcelino G. Gelvero, Sr.
 SK Pres. Frauline G. Grajales

Culture
Bantayan Festival: A celebration of the birth of a new history and culture of the people of Guimbal as a tribute and reverence to the triumphant struggle of its ancestors for meaningful existence.The magic of the Gimba (drum) and the Bantayan (watchtower) are the major features of the festival. The festival also features dance drama, drum, float & street dancing competition, film festival, cultural shows, beauty pageant, paraw & boat racing, fluvial parade, musical concerts and many other presentations.
Disyembre sa Guimbal Celebration: A two-week pompous and extravagant celebration of Christmas which started in 1975, and is held from 16th to 25 December. It has gained popular support from all sector in the municipality that made it successful annual celebration.
Annual Town Fiesta: Celebrated every 10 September in honor of St. Nicholas of Tolentino, the town's patron saint, and this week-long celebration reflects the kind of people Guimbalanon's are festive. Various activities are lined up, making celebration colorful.
Holy Week celebration (Bari-Bari): A unique observance in the Lenten season, parishioners religiously preserve the tradition of the catholic faith of remembering and observing the passion of Lord Jesus Christ. People put up the 14 kapiyas depicting the 14 station of the cross along the lansangan. After the procession of Holy Thursday and good Friday, people do the bari-bari taking the route of the procession to take a closer look of the kapiyas. Holy week is also a time of reunions, homecoming and other social gatherings for the Guimbalanons.

Tourism

Guimbal Church: The newly restored 400-year-old church made of yellow adobe and coral stones, one of the oldest in the country. Some sources on the internet mention that the church seems to date back to about 1769–1774, when it was finished after about 3 decades of construction, but that would completely contradict its fortified structure which was used against pirate invasions. Thus this information seems to be erroneous. 
Moro Watchtowers: Originally, there were four structures located in different sites along the shoreline area in the poblacion. Only three are still intact and renovated to its original condition through the Department of Tourism. These are the 17th Century structures used as look-out for raiding Moro pirates. Like the church, it was also constructed through force labor.
Guimbal Steel Bridge: Constructed during the American period. The construction was ordered by US President Roosevelt. It is approximately 0.350 kilometers long and made of Pittsburgh Steel, which were imported from Virginia, USA. It is the longest steel bridge in Western Visayas.
Public Plaza: Known for its beautiful ornamental plants and landscapes, the plaza is described by many as the little Luneta of southern Iloilo. It is well-maintained and well-lighted at night. It can be likened to a European labyrinth.
New Municipal Building: Guimbal's symbol of public service, the new municipal building houses local and national government offices in the municipality. It is branded by many as the “Parthenon of Western Visayas.” In front of the Athenian conceived open coliseum and an amphitheatre where cultural shows, programs, sports, activities, and public gatherings are held. One can experience being in the golden age of history just walking around.
Taytay Tigre: A short bridge constructed during the Spanish colonial period. It is commonly known as “Taytay Tigre” because of the tiger stone structure made part of its approaches on both sides guarding the bridge before one enters the poblacion. It was reconstructed through donation from a veteran Guimbalanon.
Ayaw-ayaw Monument: Situated on a hill, near Nahapay Elementary School. It is a life-size replica of Andres Bonifacio, father of Philippine Revolution standing proud with his bolo on his right hand. Ayaw-ayaw is a word that signifies opposition from anything or anyone. The monument was erected on the site where early American soldiers met resistance from revolutionaries. It is a symbol of bravery, a manifestation of deep love for true freedom and independence shown by revolutionaries who resisted foreign dominion.

Education

Secondary:
 Guimbal National High School in the Poblacion Area
Camangahan National High School in Barangay Camangahan
 Nalundan National High School in Barangay Nalundan
 Particion National High School in Barangay Particion

Elementary:
 Guimbal Central Elementary School, Poblacion Area
 Nanga Integrated School, Nanga
 Cabasi-Santa Rosa Integrated School, Santa Rosa-Laguna
 Atty. Blas and Maria Gerona Memorial Elementary School, Cabubugan
 Nalundan Elementary School, Nalundan
 Particion Elementary School, Partition
 P.G. Garin Memorial Elementary School, Bulad
 Igcocolo Elementary School, Igcocolo
 Sipitan-Badiang Elem. School, Sipitan- Badiang
 Camangahan Elementary School, Camangahan
 Nahapay Elementary School, Nahapay
 Buluangan Elementary School, Buluangan

References

External links

 [ Philippine Standard Geographic Code]
 Philippine Census Information
 Local Governance Performance Management System 
 Municipality of Guimbal Official Website

Municipalities of Iloilo